David Vallance Robertson (16 August 1906 – ?) was a Scottish professional footballer who played as a goalkeeper in Scottish football for Tranent Juniors, Rosslyn Juniors, St Mirren, Celtic, Clydebank and Cowdenbeath and in non-League football for York City.

References

1906 births
Footballers from Kirkcaldy
Year of death missing
Scottish footballers
Association football goalkeepers
Tranent Juniors F.C. players
St Mirren F.C. players
York City F.C. players
Celtic F.C. players
Clydebank F.C. (1914) players
Cowdenbeath F.C. players
Scottish Football League players
Midland Football League players
Scottish Junior Football Association players
Rosslyn Juniors F.C. players